Medical terms in this article are in the context of what was legally correct usage for that period where they appear in the text. Therefore "feeble-minded", "idiot", "imbecile", "lunatic", etc., should not be taken at their modern significance.
'Kew Cottages', Kew Children's Cottages and finally as Kew Residential Services is a decommissioned special development school and residential service located in Kew, an eastern suburb of Melbourne, Victoria, Australia.

History 
The Children's Cottages at Kew were first opened in 1887 as the "Idiot Ward" of Kew Asylum.  Located on the asylum's grounds, the children's cottages were established to provide separate accommodation for child inmates who had previously been housed with adult patients. Although the Cottages only admitted children as patients, many of those children remained in residence at the Cottages as adults.

The function of the institution was to provide accommodation and educational instruction for intellectually disabled children. Some Wards of the State and other various "difficult" children were also admitted.

Shortly after opening, the Idiot Ward began functioning separately from the Kew Lunatic Asylum, and became known as the Kew Idiot Asylum from 1887 until c.1929. From 1929 they have been known as the "Children's Cottages, Kew" or alternatively "Kew Cottages Training Centre".

In April 1996, nine residents, all men and aged from 30 to 40, died in a fire. The two cottages, with a shared roof, had been housing 25 people at the time.

The institution was finally closed in July 2008, after the grounds were redeveloped from 2001 to October 2006.

See also
 List of Australian psychiatric institutions

References

Further reading

External links
 Kew Cottages History website
 Capturing Kew Cottages
 La Trobe University Kew Cottages history project
 Kew News (DHS) (PDF)
 Astrid Judge - Growing up at Kew Cottages
 Kew Cottages Coalition

Hospital buildings completed in 1887
Psychiatric hospitals in Australia
Defunct hospitals in Victoria (Australia)
History of Victoria (Australia)
Hospitals established in 1887
2008 disestablishments in Australia
1887 establishments in Australia